The 1931–32 Duke Blue Devils men's basketball team represented Duke University during the 1931–32 men's college basketball season. The head coach was Eddie Cameron, coaching his fourth season with the Blue Devils. The team finished with an overall record of 14–11.

References 

Duke Blue Devils men's basketball seasons
Duke
1932 in sports in North Carolina
1931 in sports in North Carolina